The 2010 Karshi Challenger was a professional tennis tournament played on outdoor hard courts. It was the fourth edition of the tournament which is part of the 2010 ATP Challenger Tour. It took place in Qarshi, Uzbekistan between 16 and 21 August 2010.

ATP entrants

Seeds

 Rankings are as of August 9, 2010.

Other entrants
The following players received wildcards into the singles main draw:
  Murad Inoyatov
  Temur Ismailov
  Abduvoris Saidmukhamedov
  Vaja Uzakov

The following players received entry from the qualifying draw:
  Samuel Groth
  Artem Smirnov
  Vishnu Vardhan
  Michael Venus

Champions

Singles

 Blaž Kavčič def.  Michael Venus, 7–6(6), 7–6(5)

Doubles

 Gong Maoxin /  Li Zhe def.  Divij Sharan /  Vishnu Vardhan, 6–3, 6–1

External links
Official website
ITF Search 

Karshi Challenger
Karshi Challenger